TTK Prestige Limited is an Indian company that manufactures kitchen appliances and cookware, under the "Prestige" and "Judge" brand. The company is best known for its pressure cookers.

Company history

TTK Prestige was incorporated as a private limited company on October 22, 1955, in Madras (now Chennai) under the name TT Private Limited. It began manufacture of pressure cookers in 1959 with technical collaboration from Prestige Group of the United Kingdom. The company went public in 1988, and changed to its present name in 1994. It is known for its innovative marketing strategy, be it distributing pamphlet from helicopter in the fifties or introducing the exchange scheme.

Awards

 Power Brand Award
 Best place to work certified

See also
TTK Healthcare Limited 
TTK Services Private Limited

References

Indian companies established in 1955
Manufacturing companies of India
Companies based in Chennai
Indian brands
TTK Group
1955 establishments in Madras State
Companies listed on the National Stock Exchange of India
Companies listed on the Bombay Stock Exchange